Kempton is a very small village in south Shropshire, England. The village was listed as one of William de Picot's holdings in the Domesday Book of 1086. It lies on the small River Kemp, which it takes its name from.

See also
Listed buildings in Clunbury

References

External links

Villages in Shropshire